Aastha Gill (born 24 June 1991) is an Indian singer and songwriter who debuted with the party song Dhup Chik from Fugly. She came up with the dance number Abhi Toh Party Shuru Hui Hai from Khoobsurat. She is known for her singles DJ Wale Babu, Buzz and Naagin. She was a contestant on the stunt-based reality show Fear Factor: Khatron Ke Khiladi 11.

Discography

Soundtrack film albums

Singles

Television

References

External links

Living people
Indian women playback singers
Bollywood playback singers
Singers from Delhi
Women musicians from Delhi
21st-century Indian women singers
21st-century Indian singers
1991 births
Fear Factor: Khatron Ke Khiladi participants